The South African Railways Class 14A 4-8-2 of 1914 was a steam locomotive.

In 1914 and 1915, the South African Railways placed 41 Class 14A steam locomotives with a 4-8-2 Mountain type wheel arrangement in service. It was a lighter version of the Class 14 which had entered service a year earlier.

Manufacturer
Following the success of the Class 14, D.A. Hendrie, Chief Mechanical Engineer (CME) of the South African Railways (SAR), used its design as basis for the lighter Class 14A locomotive for use on coastal lines, particularly the Cape Eastern line from East London where the physical conditions were approximately similar to those of the lower sections of the Natal mainline, but the permanent way was not as heavy. This second version of the Class 14 was ordered from the North British Locomotive Company in 1913 and was built in two batches. Twenty were delivered in 1914, numbered in the range from 1576 to 1595, and another 21 in 1914 and 1915, numbered in the range from 1901 to 1921.

Characteristics

The locomotives were erected at the East London workshops. Apart from their boilers and cylinders, the frame and other important components were standard with those of the Class 14, such as the coupled wheels, bogie, Pyle National turbo-generators and headlamps, Hasler speed indicator, sight feed lubricators, Hendrie's steam reversing gear, steam operation for rocking the firegrate, Gresham and Craven injectors, steam brakes and combination vacuum ejectors. One noticeable visible difference from the Class 14 was the absence of the two large sandboxes on each running board.

Watson Standard boilers
During the 1930s, many serving locomotives were reboilered with a standard boiler type designed by then CME A.G. Watson as part of his standardisation policy. Such Watson Standard reboilered locomotives were reclassified by adding an "R" suffix to their classification.

From the mid-1930s, all the Class 14A locomotives except no. 1915 were eventually reboilered with Watson Standard no. 2 boilers. In the process they were also equipped with Watson cabs with their distinctive slanted fronts, compared to the conventional vertical fronts of their original cabs. In spite of still being nearly  lighter after reboilering, they were reclassified to Class 14R along with reboilered Class 14 locomotives instead of to Class 14AR. Even so, they could still be identified as ex Class 14A locomotives by the absence of the big sandboxes on their running boards.

Their original Belpaire boilers were fitted with Ramsbottom safety valves, while the Watson Standard boiler was fitted with Pop safety valves. An obvious difference between an original and a Watson Standard reboilered locomotive is usually a rectangular regulator cover just to the rear of the chimney on the reboilered locomotive. In the case of reboilered Class 14A locomotives, two even more obvious differences are the Watson cab and the absence of the Belpaire firebox hump between the cab and boiler on the reboilered locomotives.

Service

South African Railways
As intended, the Class 14A was placed in service on the East London mainline. Although they were good engines, they were not very successful there and were soon relocated to be shared between the Cape Western system for use between Cape Town and Beaufort West and the Eastern Transvaal system for use on the line to Delagoa Bay out of Pretoria, particularly between Waterval Boven and Komatipoort. The Cape Western's engines later joined the rest of the Class in the Eastern Transvaal. They proved themselves as free steaming locomotives, low on maintenance costs and trouble-free, and therefore popular with crews and fitters alike.

Industrial
Six were eventually sold into industrial service.
 No. 1586 went to Rustenburg Platinum Mines, retaining its SAR number.
 No. 1589 became Bob at the Vaal Reefs Gold Mine.
 No. 1906 became Randfontein Estates Gold Mine no. 6.
 No. 1908 became Apex Colliery no. 4 at Greenside. 
 No. 1918 went to St Helena Gold Mines.
 No. 1921 became Grootvlei Proprietary Mines Limited no. 3 Duggie.

Preservation

Illustration
The main picture shows second order Class 14R no. 1905 at Klerksdorp, Transvaal, on 17 April 1978. The first of the following pictures illustrate the locomotive as built, while the rest show reboilered Class 14R (ex Class 14A) locomotives in service.

References

1750
1750
1750
4-8-2 locomotives
2D1 locomotives
NBL locomotives
Cape gauge railway locomotives
Railway locomotives introduced in 1914
1914 in South Africa
Scrapped locomotives